The 2019 South Lakeland District Council election took place on 2 May 2019 to elect members of South Lakeland District Council in Cumbria, England. One third of the council was up for election.

Results

! colspan="10" |

Ward Results

Ambleside & Grasmere

Arnside & Milnthorpe

Bowness & Levens

Broughton & Coniston

Burton & Crooklands

Furness Peninsula

Grange

Kendal East

Kendal Rural

Kendal South & Natland

Kendal Town

Kendal West

Sedbergh & Kirkby Lonsdale

Ulverston East

Ulverston West

Windermere

By-elections
Four by-elections were held on 6 May 2021.

Broughton & Coniston

Furness Peninsula

Grange

Kendal Rural

 

One by-election was held on 12 August 2021

Grange

 

One by-election was held on 23 September 2021.

Kendal North

References 

South Lakeland
South Lakeland District Council elections
2010s in Cumbria
May 2019 events in the United Kingdom